Halsnøya or Halsnøy is an island in Kvinnherad municipality in Vestland county, Norway. The  island lies between the Hardangerfjorden and Skånevikfjorden. The island has about 2,300 inhabitants (2008) and it is the most populated island in Kvinnherad municipality.  Prior to 2008, it was the most populated island in Norway without a direct connection to land, but the Halsnøy Tunnel opened that year, finally connecting it to the mainland by road.  There is a regular ferry connection from southern Halsnøy to the neighboring islands of Fjelbergøya and Borgundøya, located just south of Halsnøy.

History
The island was the site of the Halsnøy Abbey (closed in 1536), which once was one of the richest monasteries in Norway.  Today it is a highly popular tourist attraction. In 1896, one of the oldest boats recovered in Norway was found in the Toftevåg bay on the north side of the island. It was reconstructed to full-scale in 2006, and a monument was erected at the location of the recovery.

Urban areas and industry 

Halsnøy is usually divided into two unofficial zones by its locals: "utøyo" (the outer island) and "innøyo" (the inner island). The "outer island" district consists of the villages of Sæbøvik and Eidsvik, located on the narrow northwestern part of the island. The "inner island" district is usually considered as the village area of Høylandsbygd and the larger, more rural, and rugged southeastern part of the island. Høylandsbygd is one of Western Norway's shipping capitals.

Tourism and places of interest
Halsnøy is a popular place for tourists, especially from Germany and the Netherlands. Some of its most popular tourism attractions include Radiohola, the Halsnøy Abbey, and the Høylandsbygd shipping mural.

Notable residents
Some famous people from Halsnøy include: 
 Tor Bjarne Bjelland, drummer for Trucks and Robert Post
 Johannes Eide, shipping magnate and decorated local activist
 Bjarte Agdestein, one of the creators of Oscar-winning short film The Danish Poet

See also
List of islands of Norway

References

External links

Ekteparet visste ikkje at dei bur i eit område med kvikkleire [The married couple did not know that they live in an area with quick clay] (18 February 2021)

Kvinnherad
Islands of Vestland
Populated places in Vestland